The knockout stage of the 2009 FIFA Confederations Cup began on 24 June and concluded on 28 June 2009 with the final at the Ellis Park Stadium, Johannesburg. It was the second and final stage of the 2009 FIFA Confederations Cup, following the group stage. The top two teams from each group (four teams in total) advanced to the knockout stage to compete in a single-elimination style tournament. A third-place match was included and played between the two losing teams of the semi-finals.

In the knockout stage (including the final), if a match was level at the end of 90 minutes, extra time of two periods (15 minutes each) would be played. If the score was still level after extra time, the match would be decided by a penalty shoot-out.

Qualified teams

Bracket

Semi-finals

Spain v United States

Brazil v South Africa

Match for third place

Final

The 2009 FIFA Confederations Cup Final was held at Ellis Park Stadium, Johannesburg, South Africa, on 28 June 2009 and was contested by the United States and Brazil. This was the first appearance ever for the United States in the final of a FIFA men's competition. This was Brazil's fourth appearance in a Confederations Cup final (after 1997, 1999 and 2005). Brazil won their third Confederations Cup title.

Prior to the match, FIFA honoured Cameroonian midfielder Marc-Vivien Foé, who died of a heart-related disease during a FIFA Confederations Cup match in 2003.

References

External links
 

Knockout stage
Knock
2008–09 in South African soccer
knock
Knock